Richard Domba Mady (10 January 1953 – 3 July 2021) was a Congolese Roman Catholic prelate. He served as the third Bishop of the Roman Catholic Diocese of Doruma–Dungu, located in northeast Democratic Republic of the Congo, from his installation on 31 July 1994 until his death on 3 July 2021. During his tenure, his diocese endured a series of attacks during the numerous conflicts affecting the eastern Democratic Republic of Congo, including the First Congo War, the Second Congo War, and the aftermath of these wars.

Richard Domba Mady died at the HJ Hospital in Kinshasa on 3 July 2021, at the age of 68. His death was announced by Marcel Utembi Tapa, the Archbishop of the Roman Catholic Archdiocese of Kisangani and President of the Episcopal Conference of the Democratic Republic of the Congo (Cenco).

References

External links

1953 births
2021 deaths
Roman Catholic bishops of Doruma–Dungu
Democratic Republic of the Congo Roman Catholic bishops
20th-century Roman Catholic bishops in the Democratic Republic of the Congo
21st-century Roman Catholic bishops in the Democratic Republic of the Congo